ABPA may refer to:
 Allergic bronchopulmonary aspergillosis, a condition characterised by an exaggerated response of the immune system 
 American Benefit Plan Administrators, a US-based employee benefits administration firm